Taleigão, or Platô de Taleigão, is a neighborhood located in the southern part of the city of Panaji, the capital of the Indian state of Goa. It is entirely located on the island of Tiswadi, which is one of the talukas in the state of Goa. The neighborhood is known for its important campus at the Goa University.

Overview
Taleigão lies in Ilhas de Goa and is bordered by the Arabian Sea to the west, vast tracts of fields to the east, Odxel-Vaiguinim-Dona Paula to the south and Santa Inez-Bhatlem to the north. Located five kilometres from Panjim, Taleigão was considered the granary of the north Goa during the Portuguese era, as vast tracts of agricultural land were then under rice cultivation.

Taleigão is known for itspalm-fringed beaches, bright green paddy fields and Nagalli hill, age-old traditional houses and mansions, broad roads, footpaths, a centuries-old church, traffic circles with azulejo titles, chapels and temples, educational institutions, hotels and restaurants and of course its inhabitants.

The population is currently a mixed group with lot of settlers from other parts of Goa and other parts of India, especially on the Dona Paula Plateau and elsewhere. The aboriginal inhabitants are the Gawda tribes who were—and some still are—involved in cultivation of the Comunidade land.

Taleigão Panchayat, the local administrative structure, has been functioning since the 1960s. The first Sarpanch (village panchayat head) of Taleigão village after the end of Portuguese rule in Goa was freedom fighter Late Narayan Naik in 1966.

Origin of name 
Taleigão or Taleiganv, gets its name from the local language, Konkani, Tolle-ganv, Tall-ganv or Toll-ganv. Toll-ganv, a contraction for somtoll ganv, meaning a level village, neither on a hill nor in a valley. Tall-ganv refers to the fact that Taleigão is the last village of Tiswadi, beyond which is the mouth of the river Mandovi flowing into the Arabian Sea. However, the most likely origin is Tollem-ganv. Along the path to Durgavaddi, in Taleigão, there is a tollem, i.e. a lake or a pond, which is how the name stuck, Tollea-ganv or Tolloi-ganv, the village (ganv) of the lake or pond.

Religious institutions

Church of São Miguel Arcanjo
The Igreja de São Miguel Arcanjo (Church of St Michael the Archangel) is one of the oldest churches in Goa, and was built by the Dominicans in 1544. It is also the only church in the neighborhood, serving one of the largest parishes in Goa. From the census conducted in 2015 there are about 12,000 Catholic population. The Chapel of Blessed Sacrament was annexed in 2006 during the tenure of Fr. Carmo Martins. The assistant parish priest have been Fr. Xavier Braganza and parish priest is Fr. Conceiçao D’Silva, who took charge of the church in June 2011,and took the initiatives to give a facelift to the church and renovate the parochial house and church office. The compound wall fitted with azulejo tiles bordering the Adro da Igreja de São Miguel and the illumination around it were added by Atanasio (Babush) Monserrate. The Taleigão parish celebrates two main feasts: the harvest feast on 21 August, and the feast of the patron - St. Minguel - on the nearest Sunday on or after 29 September.

The president of the feast of St Michael is selected from amongst the senior (those who have crossed 60 years) gaunkars of Comunidade de Taleigão. The selection is done a Sunday before the feast day by a process where the names of the eligible gaunkars  along with beads are put in a circular box with three compartments. Every gauncar who participated in the election inserts beads in the box through a small hole in the center. The lid of the box is rotated to ensure that the beads falls in the compartments at random. The gaunkar who scores the highest number of beads is elected to be the president for the forthcoming year. On the feast day, before the final blessing, the copper hat of St. Michael is placed on the head of the president-elect and a short prayer is recited for his good health. The Comunidade de Taleigão makes a provision for the expenses of the feast, novenas and vespers. In addition, the parishioners celebrate the feast of Our Lady of Rosary and Perpetua Succor.

The frontispiece of the church has a Holy Spirit in high relief. The Church has six altars, including the main altar. The main altar has the statue of St Michael above and to the right that of St Sebastian and to the left of St Anthony. The collateral altars: on the left is the altar of Our Lady of Rosary with a small statue of Saint Ana in a niche on top. To the right is the altar of Jesus Crucified and the statue of Saint Rita of Cassia. Another two altars have been added: one to the left has a panel and to the right is that of Our Lady with Infant Jesus with a book in his hand and a smaller statue at the bottom with Jesus. And closer to the entrance, to the right is the altar dedicated to Sacred Heart of Jesus with Sacred Heart of Mary and Saint Joseph Vaz on the sides. Statue of St Mother Teresa was added in 2016.

The corridor of the Church has big panels along the wall, on the left side, which depicts the portraits of: Saint John the Baptist, Saint Roque and Saint Francis of Assisi, Saint Peter, Saint Carlo Borromeo. On the right hand side is another painting of Jesus on the Cross at Mount Calvary, with Mother Mary, Mary Magdalena and others. In the wall, there is a niche, with Our Lady holding the Infant Jesus. On the right hand side, there are five statues on pedestals—of Saint Dominic de Guzman, three different depiction, with a star on the forehead, in prayer and with the Bible in hand and Saint Thomas Aquinas, two different depiction, one with a sun on his chest and the other holding the Blessed Sacrament. A description of the Church of Taleigão is given by Ricardo Micael Teles in ‘A Voz de S. Francisco Xavier’, in 1941.

The main altar does not have a retable, which some 60 to 70 years back, was substituted by the throne of Exposition of the Sacrament. In this retable there were six big images of Dominican saints; five of which are in the corridor of the church. These were even taken to the fourth centenary celebrations of the canonical erection of the Archdiocese of Goa. The image of the patron saint St Michael Archangel is venerated in the niche where the Holy Sacrament is exposed. On this occasion the statue of St Michael is turned so that the rays on his back are used to expose the monstrance (custodia). On the sides of the wall are the images St Anthony and St Sebastian. The collateral altars are dedicated to Our Lady of Rosary and to Jesus Crucified with Our Lady. The first, has on top, the image of St Anna with her daughter in her lap with a globe in her hand and the second the image of St Rita de Cassia, (Augustinian). These images must have been put up after those of the Dominicans were removed. Of late the altar of Sacred Heart of Jesus was established. There is also an altar dedicated to the Holy Souls. According to Teles there were three Confraternities, namely Our Lady of Rosary, Our Lady of Loreto and that of Holy Souls. Francisco Xavier Gomes Catão mentions in the Anuário da Arquidiocese de Goa e Damão (1953), that there are seven altars in the Church. In 1972 the Church underwent restoration work which was funded by Mr. Arthur Ligorio Benedicto Anunciaçao Viegas, who at the time spent rupees 60,000 and the Pope Paul VI honoured him with ‘Medalha de Proeclesia Pontificie’.

There are plans to built a modern St Michael Parish community center consisting of gathering hall, a clinic for elderly, a library, class rooms for catechism children and a meeting room for youth.

Chapels in Taleigão
Taleigão also has at least twelve chapels and a number of road-side crosses, some  sheltered in the recent past. The oldest chapel, built by Franciscans in 1541 at Cabo, is dedicated to Nossa Senhora Mãe de Deus. It houses exquisite artefacts including a 17th-century portrait of the infant Jesus made of ivory. St. Pedro Copel, also known as Ruzai Saibinichem Copel (Nossa Senhora do Rosário) at Caranzalem was built in the year 1731 by Cónego Francisco da Cunha Souto Maior. St. Francis Xavier's Chapel at Kerant originally known as Copela de San Francisco Xavier de Taleigão was built in 1928. It was blessed on 10 October 1930 by the then Bishop of Cochin and Administrator Apostolate, its first mass celebrated on 12 October 1930. It was enlarged in 1935 and renovated in 2002. Just 100 meters from this chapel is Nossa Senhora da Piedade in Eugênio ward built by Eugênio Dias and his wife Rosa Maria Fernandes. It was blessed on November 20, 1823 but only opened to the public on November 18, 1846. Another chapel at Odxel dedicated to Nossa Senhora de Lourdes was constructed by Rev. Querobino Martins of Taleigão in November 1891. This chapel has now been handed over to the Salesians of Don Bosco. The foundation stone for the building of the chapel of Nossa Senhora do Perpétuo Socorro at Dona Paula was laid on September 21, 1935 and the chapel was blessed on May 23, 1937

Temples
There are about fifteen temples; the oldest ones being Shree Tulsimata Pandurang Sansthan at Vodlem Bhat and Shree Shankar Devasthan at Shankarwadi which were enlarged from a gumti structure which existed during the Portuguese era.  Among the others, the most unusual ones is Shri Mahalaxmi Devasthan at Oitalem. Both these temples have a Cross inside the temple and candles are lit every night by Hindu devotees and Litanies are held occasionally with the involvement of the Catholic community.

Mosques
Taleigão has a mixed population of slightly over 17,000. The Catholic population is more than 12,000 followed closely by Hindus  and Muslims. There are two Masjids in this village, at Vodlem Bhat and at Adarsh.

Feasts

Konsanche fest of Taleigão (Harvest feast)
In the entire Ilhas de Goa, the Taleigão village was officially accorded the privilege by the then Portuguese Governor Afonso de Albuquerque to cut the first sheaves of rice and present it to the Creator on 21 August. Traditionally, the harvest feast is celebrated with the music of brass bands, a colourful ceremonial umbrella, cannon fire, procession and high mass at São Miguel Arcanjo church. This thanksgiving ceremony commemorates the Festa da Espiga or Novidade– a time for rejoicing and worship for the cultivators, in gratitude for the bountiful crop bestowed.

History of the Novidade
The Novidade has a history of nearly five centuries years dating back to the arrival of Portuguese in India in 1510. On seeking to conquer Goa in 1510, the Portuguese fleet ran into the monsoon and could not leave the Mandovi river as the exit route was blocked by the sand bar formed at the entrance of Aguada Bay. So the troops got stranded and were forced to take shelter on the rafters at the edge of the Mandovi river at Britona. It was a thick forest area with no inhabitants in those days. The Portuguese troops eventually ran out of provisions and had to survive on rats. The fishermen from Taleigão who had ventured into the river learnt the plight of the Portuguese troops and they informed the people of Taleigão. The Taleigão gauncars (early village settlers who had the control over the agricultural land) took the initiative of supplying provisions to the troops at the dead of the night by risking their lives from the Muslim troops and inclement weather. They would load the provisions on bullock carts and transport them towards Aivão (a small fishing hamlet at Caranzalem), where the fishermen used to anchor their canoes. After unloading the same in the canoes they would row the canoe with the aid of an oil lamp towards Britona at the dead of the night.  After three months of waiting, Afonso de Albuquerque was joined by more reinforcements accompanied by Diogo Mendes de Vasconcelos from Malacca. After fighting alongside Timoji and the local Hindus for less than a day, the Portuguese captured Goa from the  Bijapuri rulers on 10 December 1510.

In 1514, Afonso de Albuquerque devoted himself fully to governing Goa. He gradually elevated Goa to a political and commercial capital of Portuguese India. He established coin minting. In memory of the conquest of Ilhas, Afonso de Albuquerque built a chapel dedicated to St. Catherine at Old Goa which was enlarged into a big church which is now known as Sé Cathedral. In recognition of the help rendered by the people of Taleigão, by offering food provisions to his troops, Afonso de Albuquerque granted them the privilege to cut the first sheaves of rice on 21 August, prior to the other villages in Ilhas. This decree has been described in the Foral of Portuguese writer Afonso Mexia dated 16 September 1526, Article 54 which says: "The village of Taleigão has prominence over the others to harvest the paddy. The gaonkars will come every year with sheaves of paddy stalks to the city of Goa (now old Goa), where it will be presented at the main altar at the Se Cathedral. From there, the Vicar will come with them to the Fort where the Factor will present a pachari (a white or coloured shawl), on which he is allowed to spend four pardaos (currency of the time). To the gaonkar who has been selected amongst them for this honour. Thereafter, the harvesting in other villages can be effected."

Afonso de Albuquerque strengthened the foundation of the existing agricultural association and named it as a Communidade. He introduced rules and regulation (Código de Communidades) which empowered them with administrative, financial and judicial powers. He took the initiative in appointing managing committees of Gauncars to administer and monitor the distribution of agricultural land (aforamento & shares) and collection of revenue from the agricultural produce, which was used for the welfare of village community and paying dividends (zonos). As a result of these reforms and transparency in the system, the Communidade of Taleigão prospered economically from the rice cultivation on vast tracts of land and earned the distinction of being the granary of Ilhas de Goa. As a tradition, on 24 August the President of the feast and the representatives of gauncars present the first sheaves of rice to the Portuguese Governor who was the custodian of the Communidade land. As a part of the Hindu culture, the then Gauncars who were Hindus offered these sheaves and sought blessings from the village deity. After embracing Christianity, the Gauncars continued these traditions with Eucharistic celebration in church and dedication of the sheaves to the patron of the village - São Miguel Arcanjo. This explains why the Communidade Gauncars have the privilege of celebrating the Festa da Espiga and the feast of patron São Miguel Arcanjo. The Gauncars maintained the church (painting, repairs, bell tower, etc.) and village roads, bunds, etc., using the funds of the Communidade.

Traditions of the Novidade
Taleigão is the only village in Goa where the Novidade is celebrated traditionally for 4 days (21–24 August). The feast is celebrated in rotation among the Gauncar families in the following order: Mendonça, Viegas, Martins, Luis, Gomes, Faria, Almeida, Falcão, and Abreu.

21 August: Cannons (fosné) are fired at noon and during the pealing of the Angelus bell on the previous day to convey to the neighbouring villages that Taleigão is all set to celebrate the Novidade. On 21 August, the Alvarado de Música played at dawn in the village lanes heralds the celebration and sets the village folk into festive mood. At 8:30 am, President of the feast marches under the cover of a colourful ceremonial umbrella to the São Miguel Arcanjo church to the beats of brass band. From the church the parishioners proceed in a procession to the field at Tolliant earmarked by the Comunidade for cutting of the sheaves. In 90's the procession used to be led by dhol caxia (drum)and a trumpet, followed by Adao representing the village tribes dressed in colourful costumes and dancing with bamboo sticks and swords. They are followed by flag of holy trinity (previously it was Portuguese flag)and the parishioners, the Confrades carrying the statue of the patron São Miguel Arcanjo on Charol, the feast President, the Parish priest, and the brass band playing religious tunes. The procession proceeds along the Estrada de Santos Passos which joins to Rua de Novidade. This 1 km long route is traditionally decorated with 24 arches of bamboo shoots. After a short prayer, the Parish priest blesses the sheaves by sprinkling holy water and burning incense. Then the feast President cuts the sheaves with a silver sickle and carries them in a silver tray to the church. While returning to the church, prayers and sheaves are also offered at the São Miguel Arcanjo chapel en route. High mass is celebrated at the church at 10:00 am. After the mass, the parishioners participate in the Quermés (games) organised by the parish youth, with the background music of brass band. In the afternoon, coconut breaking competitions are held at every nook and corner of the village and the football finals of Säo Miguel trophy is organised at Dr. Alvaro Remigio Pinto ground by the Clube de Säo Miguel de Taleigão. In tune with Goan cultural traditions, the day ends with a Tiatr in the late evening.

22 August: With the boom of cannons in the background and accompanied by the traditional band, the feast President sets out to distribute fov (beaten rice) to nine Gauncar families living in different wards of the village. In tune with the Christian teachings, this act of distributing beaten rice represents sharing of joy and happiness of the rich harvest.

23 August: At 4:00 pm, the President of the feast accompanied by traditional band and the boom of canons proceeds to the church and offers fov at the altar of São Miguel Arcanjo. After prayers by the Parish priest, fov are presented to him at the parochial house. This act shows the Act of sharing of joy with the Parish Priest.

24 August: The male representatives of the nine Gauncar families and three members of the Comunidade managing committee carry the blessed sheaves, fov, and flower bouquet to Sé Cathedral, Old Goa, which was the capital of Goa until the 18th century and the Sé Cathedral was the main church. The group is received at the church entrance by the Parish Priest of Sé Cathedral with the pealing of the golden bell and playing of the traditional band in the background. A special mass is celebrated on the occasion which is also attended by devotees residing around Old Goa. The blessed sheaves are then distributed by the priest during the mass. After the mass, fov are also distributed by the President of the feast to the congregation and the resident priests. Later, the group presents fov and sheaves to the Archbishop at Paço Patriarcal and to the Governor of Goa at Raj Bhavan. At Raj Bhavan, the feast President reads out a short speech highlighting the various difficulties faced by villagers in cultivating the fields, drainage system, etc. In the afternoon the group is treated to a sumptuous lunch consisting of twelve dishes at the feast President's residence, with a boom of cannons in the background. It is customary to play a game of cards for entertainment.

The traditions of Novidade revive the bond of friendship between the families under the tutelage of the Comunidade de Taleigão and blessings of the patron São Miguel Arcanjo.

Landmarks
Prominent landmarks in Taleigão include São Miguel Church, which was established in 1544 by the order of preachers called Dominicans and is currently one of Goa's oldest churches. Taleigão hosts one of the finest football grounds in Goa - the Dr. Remigio Pinto Football Ground and the best all season spacious Community Hall which caters to weddings, social functions, trade fairs, etc.

Educational institutions
Taleigão plateau hosts the main hub of higher education, the Goa University.  There is a higher secondary school at Dona Paula and a number of high schools, middle schools, primary schools, and pre-primary schools in Taleigão catering to the educational needs of the children. Don Bosco at Odxel run by Salesians caters to the all round development of the children from the weaker sections of the society. Bookworm Children's Library situated behind the church is a knowledge bank of our youngsters and meets the increasing demands of the readers. The National Institute of Oceanography at Dona Paula is one of the pioneer centres for oceanographic research in India.

Playgrounds
Football is in the blood of Taleigãokars. The church square (adró) served as main playground where most of the village lads practiced football under the mentorship of Dr. Alvaro Remegio Pinto. Thereafter many of them, including Brahmanand Sankhwalkar, brought laurels to Taleigão by playing for professional football clubs and winning national tournaments. The Portuguese constructed the first playground at Borchem Bhat which was handed over to a club known as Grupo Desportivo de Caranzalem to encourage football in Taleigão. Dr. Alvaro Remegio Pinto was instrumental in organising football tournaments at the church square (adró). As a memory of his contribution to the football, the playground besides the Community hall bears his name.

Parks
Taleigão has a number of parks. One of the biggest parks in Taleigão is the jogger's park at Caranzalem on the Miramar – Dona Paula road. The park and play ground next to the Dr. Remigio Pinto ground is also crowded with children. The parks at Durgawadi, Posrem Bhat, Nagali, Alto Nagali and landscape garden at Dona Paula are also worth mentioning.

Beaches
Taleigão's beaches include those at Odxel, Vainguinim, Dona Paula, Aivao, and Caranzalem - which have been known as picnic spots for decades. People from Old Goa, St. Estevam and Ponda still come to these beaches in the summer to bathe. The Aivao-Caranzalem bay is known for fishing activity. In the Portuguese era, the canoes used to land here with a large catch of fish including mackerel and sardines. These were salted and dried on the sand, while the excess catch was auctioned. Locals and farmers from far off places like Merces used it as manure for agriculture and horticulture.

Hillock of Dona Paula
This place is named after Dona Paula Amaral Antonio de Souto. Dona is a title given to married noble woman under Portuguese customs. She was the daughter of Portuguese Viceroy in Sri Lanka who along with her family arrived in Goa 1644. She married Dom Antonio Souto Maior, a wealthy Fidalgo in 1656, who owned large properties extending from Cabo to Caranzalem. She was known for charity and worked for betterment of the villagers. After her death in December 1682, as a gratitude to her kindness the villagers renamed the place as Dona Paula, which was originally called Oddavell. The statues of philosopher couple Mr and Mrs. Robert Knox which were carved by German sculptress Baroness Yrse Von Leistner are seen atop the rock. One gets a splendid view of the Arabian Sea and the landscape from the hillock. The jetty which is used for navigation has been renovated and the route has been paved and illuminated recently. The water sports facilities in the vicinity also attract tourists. A large part of Hindi movie Ek Duuje ke Liye was shot here, which popularised the place further.

Casa do Povo de Taleigão
It was the community hall which was built and inaugurated by the last Portuguese Governor of Goa, General Vassalo de Silva on 21 August 1961. It houses a hall with stage, and offices of the Comunidade de Taleigão and Club de São Miguel de Taleigão. Tiatrs used to be held in the hall on the occasion of church feast. Wedding receptions were also held in olden days.

Taleigão Community Hall
One of the attractions of the village is the impressive, spacious and ultra-modern community hall. This all-season hall is famous for marriage receptions, international and national meetings, social gatherings, parties, etc.  The interiors, illumination, outdoor stage and spacious parking are some features that attract the people from all over Goa to organise various social and cultural events. The basement houses the office of the village Panchayat.

Antique houses
Taleigão  is home to many Portuguese-style old and grand houses. In Santissimo ward - the house of Mulgaonkar (vodlem ghor) at Voilem Bhat, the double storied house of Dr. Remegio Pinto, Jose Martins house (currently occupied by the Asha Mahal), Jervasio Viegas house (behind the church), and the Almeida house (opposite Cidade Haven); Oietalem-Viegas house (Las Viegas); Bodiem-houses of the Mendonças and Prof. Carlos Viegas (taken over by the Shirodkar family); the house of Fernando Martins at Martins Morod; Kerant - Villa Zacarias, Raposo house, Vas house (opposite the rice mill), and Keni house at Adarsh; Caranzalem- Vivenda Prazaires (opposite Auxilium High School) and Casa Decha are some of the old and grand houses that have still retained their old architectural style, antique furniture, and ambiance.

Cabo Raj Nivas
Originally a 16th century convent built by Franciscans, it was later fortified to act as a sentinel over the confluence of the Zuari and Mandovi rivers.  Later converted into a palace where the Portuguese Viceroys and Governor Generals resided. Now it is the residence of the Governor of Goa. The palace has a large Darbar hall, spacious verandahs with views of the Arabian Sea, Bohemian glass chandeliers, Chinese porcelain, antique tableware, assorted paintings and a garden. The Capela de Nossa Senhora Mae de Deus is annexed to the Cabo Raj Bhavan. Its feast is celebrated on August 15. Zig-zag steps leads to a grotto with a rock-carved altar. A small museum displays replicas of sculpture of Hindu deities dating back to the 11th century and beyond, besides some Christian icon and figurines.

British cemetery
A British cemetery exists in the vicinity which houses the graves of an 18th century British garrison led by Sir William Clarke, which entered Goa on the pretext of protecting Goa from a possible French invasion. They were stationed at the Cabo (Dona Paula), Fort Aguada and Fort Mormugao and stayed at Marivel from 1799 and 1813. The cemetery has an ornate semi-circular archway that leads to graves and memorial stones.

Statue of Jack de Sequeira
The nine-metre bronze statue of Dr. Jack de Sequeira was unveiled on 20 April 2007 at Dona Paula circle, as a tribute to the local leader who is considered the Father of the Opinion Poll in Goa and a staunch promponent of Goa's identity.

Dr Shyama Prasad Mukherjee Indoor Stadium 

Bambolim Athletic Indoor Stadium is an indoor stadium located on the campus of Goa University. The stadium was constructed for the 2014 Lusophony Games for events of volleyball and basketball. The stadium is named after Dr Shyama Prasad Mukherjee former Indian politician and the founder of Bhartiya Jana Sangh. The stadium has a seating capacity of 4000 and was inaugurated by Governor of Goa Bharat Vir Wanchoo in 2014. It cost 82 crore and was built in 11 months.

Occupation of Taleigãokars
Traditionally, agriculture and horticulture were the main occupation of the villagers, given the vast tracts of land where rice has cultivated during monsoon and vegetables were grown in summer. The flat portion on the hill tops were utilised to grow lady fingers, raggi (finger millet), snake gourd, ridge gourd, etc., in monsoon season. Taleigão's tambdi bhaji (red amaranth), sweet potatoes, brinjals, chillies, bottle gourd, etc., are famous for their taste all over Tiswadi taluka.

Since the last decade, farming has been on decline because of high labour costs, flooding of the fields in monsoon due to non-maintenance of water channels, youth taking up different occupations, migration of families to other countries, etc.

Due to mass immigration from other states of India, high-rise housingconstructions have taken over vast areas of agricultural land in Taleigão which has transformed the village into an urban settlement.

The Progressive Farmer's Club of Taleigão has taken initiatives to revive agriculture by availing government schemes. In-migration has also had its impact on the traditional lifestyles of villagers.

Government and politics
Taleigão is part of Taleigao (Goa Assembly constituency) and North Goa (Lok Sabha constituency).

Sports

Clube Sao Miguel de Taleigao, an association football club based in Taleigão, represents them in Goa Professional League, Goa's top tier.

References

 Article by son-of-soil Dr. Alvarinho J. Luis in parish bulletin - PORZOLL dated 21/8/2012 titled "The Traditions of Taleigao's harvest feast"
 Article by Luiza Luis in parish bulletin - PORZOLL dated 25/12/2012 titled " Uniqness of Taleigao"

Neighbourhoods in Panaji